Brachlewo  (German Rachelshof) is a village in the administrative district of Gmina Kwidzyn, within Kwidzyn County, Pomeranian Voivodeship, in northern Poland.

1772-1945 the area was part of Germany. For the history of the region, see History of Pomerania.

The village has a population of 366.

References

Brachlewo